David Kautter is an American lawyer and tax policy advisor who served as Assistant Secretary of the United States Treasury for Tax Policy. Prior to assuming his prior role of Assistant Secretary, he was a partner at accounting firm RSM International. Kautter was previously the managing director of the Kogod Tax Center and executive-in-residence at the Kogod School of Business at American University. He was a partner at Ernst & Young and served as tax legislative counsel for former U.S. Senator John Danforth. According to The Hill, "If confirmed, Kautter would oversee tax matters in the department and would likely play a key role in the administration's tax-reform efforts."

On October 26, 2017, President Donald Trump announced the designation of Kautter to be the acting commissioner of the Internal Revenue Service effective November 13, 2017. His acting assignment ended when current IRS Commissioner Charles P. Rettig was confirmed by the full senate on September 12, 2018 and sworn in on October 1, 2018.

References

External links
 Faculty profile at American University

Living people
University of Notre Dame alumni
Georgetown University Law Center alumni
21st-century American lawyers
American University faculty and staff
Trump administration personnel
United States Assistant Secretaries of the Treasury
Year of birth missing (living people)
Tax lawyers